Richard Lintner (born November 15, 1977) is a Slovak former professional ice hockey defenceman who last played for HC Dinamo Minsk of the Kontinental Hockey League and current television presenter. He previously played in the National Hockey League for the Nashville Predators, New York Rangers and the Pittsburgh Penguins.

International play

Lintner represented Slovakia at the World Championships every year from 2001 until 2005. On December 29, 2009, Lintner was named to Team Slovakia for the 2010 Winter Olympics in Vancouver. However, he was replaced by Ivan Baranka.

Career statistics

Regular season and playoffs

International statistics

References

External links

1977 births
Arizona Coyotes draft picks
Djurgårdens IF Hockey players
Färjestad BK players
Hartford Wolf Pack players
HC Dinamo Minsk players
HC Fribourg-Gottéron players
Ice hockey players at the 2002 Winter Olympics
Living people
Milwaukee Admirals players
Modo Hockey players
Nashville Predators players
New York Rangers players
Olympic ice hockey players of Slovakia
Pittsburgh Penguins players
SaiPa players
Skellefteå AIK players
Slovak ice hockey defencemen
Springfield Falcons players
Sportspeople from Trenčín
Wilkes-Barre/Scranton Penguins players
Slovak television presenters
Slovak expatriate ice hockey players in the United States
Slovak expatriate ice hockey players in Sweden
Slovak expatriate ice hockey players in Finland
Slovak expatriate sportspeople in Belarus
Slovak expatriate ice hockey players in Switzerland
Expatriate ice hockey players in Belarus